Pomponne de Bellièvre (1529 – 7 or 9 September 1607) was a French statesman, chancellor of France (1599–1605).

Life
Bellièvre was born in Lyon in 1529.

Between 1575 and 1588, Bellièvre accepted more than a dozen diplomatic missions for King Henry III of France (1551–1589). Sometimes he negotiated with foreign rulers, such as Elizabeth I of England, but more often with domestic antagonists, such as Henry of Navarre and his Huguenots, Henry I, Duke of Guise, and the Catholic Leaguers, and Francis, Duke of Anjou and his allies in the Low Countries. In the course of these missions Bellievre corresponded copiously with Henry III, and Bellievre also discussed them with his ministerial colleagues, often stating frankly to colleagues his discomfort with King Henry's decisions. With the king himself, he expressed his doubts more cautiously.

Farewell to Henry III
As King Henry III lay dying in 1589, Bellièvre pronounced a devastating commentary on the royal master he had served: "If kings are good, we must preserve them; if they are bad, we must endure them. God sends one or the other to punish or console His people."

References
Poncet, Olivier, Pomponne de Bellièvre (1529–1607) Un homme d’État au temps des guerres de religion (Paris: École des chartes, 1999)

Notes

1529 births
1607 deaths
Chancellors of France
Politicians from Lyon
16th-century French diplomats
17th-century French politicians
French Ministers of Finance
16th-century French politicians